Geier was a British cargo ship named Saint Théodore that was captured by the German commerce raider  in the North Atlantic Ocean at  on 12 December 1916. First put into Imperial German Navy service as an auxiliary ship on 14 December 1916, Geier was commissioned as an auxiliary cruiser on 28 December and operated in the South Atlantic Ocean until 14 February 1917, when she was scuttled near Ilha da Trindade.

References

1913 ships
Ships built on the River Clyde
World War I cruisers of Germany
Maritime incidents in 1916
Auxiliary cruisers of the Imperial German Navy
World War I commerce raiders
Maritime incidents in 1917
World War I shipwrecks in the Atlantic Ocean
Scuttled vessels of Germany